Gabriel Ávalos Stumpfs (born 12 October 1990) is a Paraguayan footballer currently playing for Argentine Primera División club Argentinos Juniors and the Paraguay national team.

International career
Ávalos represented the Paraguay national team in a 0–0 2022 FIFA World Cup qualification tie with Uruguay on 3 June 2021.

Notes

References

External links
 
 

1990 births
Living people
Paraguayan footballers
Paraguay international footballers
Paraguayan expatriate footballers
Association football forwards
Club Libertad footballers
General Díaz footballers
Atlético Tembetary footballers
Independiente F.B.C. footballers
Defensores de Cambaceres footballers
Club de Gimnasia y Esgrima La Plata footballers
Club Atlético Tigre footballers
Deportes Concepción (Chile) footballers
Crucero del Norte footballers
Peñarol players
Nueva Chicago footballers
Godoy Cruz Antonio Tomba footballers
Club Atlético Patronato footballers
Argentinos Juniors footballers
Primera B de Chile players
Argentine Primera División players
Uruguayan Primera División players
Expatriate footballers in Chile
Expatriate footballers in Argentina
Expatriate footballers in Uruguay
Paraguayan expatriate sportspeople in Argentina
Paraguayan expatriate sportspeople in Chile
Paraguayan expatriate sportspeople in Uruguay